Holywell is a market town and community in Flintshire, Wales. It lies to the west of the estuary of the River Dee. The community includes Greenfield.

Etymology
The name Holywell is literally  +  in reference to St Winefride's Well, which is situated in the town. Similarly, its Welsh name, is a compound of  "town" +  "well", meaning "town of [the] well".

History

The market town of Holywell is known for St Winefride's Well, a holy well surrounded by a chapel, itself known since at least the Roman period. It has been a site of Christian pilgrimage since about 660, dedicated to Saint Winefride who, according to legend, was beheaded there by Caradog who attempted to attack  her. The well is one of the Seven Wonders of Wales and the town bills itself as The Lourdes of Wales. Many pilgrims from all over the world continue to visit Holywell and the well.

From the 18th century, the town grew around the lead mining and cotton milling industries. The water supply from the mountains above the town, which flows continually and at a constant temperature, supplies the well and powered many factories in the Greenfield Valley. In addition to lead and cotton, copper production was of great importance. Thomas Williams, a lawyer from Anglesey, built factories and smelteries for copper in Greenfield Valley, bringing the copper from Anglesey to St. Helens and then to Greenfield Valley where it was used to make items including manilas (copper bracelets), neptunes (large flat dishes to evaporate seawater to produce salt) and copper sheathing. The copper sheathing was used to cover the hulls of the wooden ships trading in the warmer Caribbean waters, giving rise to the expression 'copper bottomed investment'. The sheathing was also applied to Royal Navy ships and was instrumental in Nelson's victories - two copper plates from HMS Victory are in Greenfield Valley Heritage Park museum. The wealth generated from these industries led to the development of the town. Holywell Town Hall was completed in 1896.

St James' Parish Church is a grade II* listed building and Holy Trinity Church in Greenfield is grade II listed. The town is also served by the modern St Peter's Church on Rose Hill, consecrated in 2008.

Railways

Holywell Junction railway station in Greenfield was on the North Wales Coast Line.  The station was closed in 1966, and trains now run fast through what remains of the station. The station building, by Francis Thompson for the Chester and Holyhead Railway (1848), is listed Grade II*. There is a campaign to reopen the station.

Holywell Town station, at the head of the steeply-climbing LNWR branch from Holywell Junction, opened in 1912 and finally closed in 1957.

Demography
In the 2011 census the population of the community, which includes the village of Greenfield, was recorded as 8,886. 
The census figure for the larger Holywell built-up area was 9,808.

The community consists of four electoral wards of the Flintshire County Council local authority:

Geography
Holywell is split into four distinct areas: Pen-y-Maes, the Strand, the Holway and the town centre. The Holway, located on the west side of the town, is the largest of the residential areas of Holywell. The near-contiguous village of Greenfield is located to the north east of the town on the B5121 road.

Villages within the Holywell catchment area include: Bagillt, Brynford, Carmel, Gorsedd, Halkyn, Holway, Licswm, Lloc, Mostyn, Pantasaph, Pentre Halkyn, Rhes-y-Cae, Trelawnyd, Whitford and Ysceifiog. In addition there are other smaller scattered communities within this area. All of these are within a six-mile radius of Holywell. These villages are all connected to Holywell by a frequent bus service.

Community
The town centre contains many small businesses and national stores, serving not only the shopping needs of the people of the town itself, but also those of the surrounding villages within the town's natural catchment area. Part of the centre of the historic market town has been designated a conservation area.

The town contains a secondary school with over 500 pupils and a leisure centre, as well as four primary schools.

Holywell has a local football team, Holywell Town who play in the Cymru North league.

The old cottage hospital was located in Pen-y-Maes until it closed. A new facility, known as the Holywell Community Hospital, opened in March 2008.

Although Holywell does not have a cricket team carrying the name of the town; a number of junior and senior cricketers from the area play for nearby village team Carmel & District Cricket Club whose ground is located a short distance from Holywell between the villages of Carmel and Lloc.

In 2007, a group of locals proposed a circular walk way, the "St Beuno's Circular Walk", joining all of the historical and religious locations of the town.

Notable people
 Saint Winifred, a 7th century Welsh virgin martyr, inspired St Winefride's Well 
 Thomas Pennant (1726–1798) naturalist, traveller, writer and antiquarian; lived at Downing Hall near Whitford.
 Rear Admiral Thomas Totty (1746–1802) naval officer of the Napoleonic Wars.
 Sarah Edith Wynne (1842–1897) operatic soprano and concert singer.
 Teresa Helena Higginson (1844–1905) Roman Catholic mystic.
 Charles Sidney Beauclerk (1855–1934), Catholic priest, revived the town as a pilgrimage centre.
 Emlyn Williams (1905–1987) writer, dramatist and actor, attended Holywell Grammar School
 Sir Ronald Waterhouse (1926–2011), High Court judge.
 Dorothy Miles (1931–1993) poet and activist in the deaf community.
 Jennifer Toye (1933–2022), operatic soprano with the D'Oyly Carte Opera Company 
 Ann Clwyd (born 1937 in Pentre Halkyn) politician, MP for Cynon Valley for 35 years; went to Ysgol Treffynnon
 Jonathan Pryce (born 1947), actor on film and TV, educated at Holywell Grammar School 
 Gareth Jones (born 1961), TV presenter, (Gaz Top) brought up in Holywell.
 Richard and Adam (Johnson) (born ca.1980), classical singers.

Sport 
 Gerry Hitchens (1934–1983), footballer with over 500 club caps, retired to Holywell from 1977 where he is buried.
 Alan Fox (1936–2021) footballer with 441 club caps mainly for Wrexham A.F.C. 
 Mike England (born 1941), footballer and manager, with 622 club caps and 44 for Wales 
 Ron Davies (1942–2013), footballer with 644 club caps and 29 for Wales
 Barry Horne (born 1962), footballer with 570 club caps and 59 for Wales
 Ian Buckett (born 1967),  rugby player, born near here and attended school in Holywell.
 Gareth Jelleyman (born 1980) footballer with over 360 club caps

See also
Holywell Workhouse Chapel
St Winefride's Church, Holywell

References

External links

Holywell website
BBC Wales: Holywell
Photos of Holywell and surrounding area on geograph.org.uk

Towns in Flintshire
Christian pilgrimages
Water wells in Wales